Kümmersbruck is a municipality in the Amberg-Sulzbach district, in the state of Bavaria, Germany. It is situated 3 km southeast of Amberg. A division of the German Military is stationed here. Kümmersbruck is split up in 7 districts: Kümmersbruck, Haselmühl, Gärmersdorf, Moos, Haidweiher, Penkhof, Lengenfeld and Engelsdorf. The river Vils crosses the municipality.

Town twinnings
Kümmersbruck is twinned with:
 Campbeltown, Argyll, Scotland 
 Holýšov, Czech Republic

References

Amberg-Sulzbach